Cameron Grant (born 24 February 1970) is a Canadian former breaststroke swimmer. He competed in two events at the 1988 Summer Olympics.

References

External links
 

1970 births
Living people
Canadian male breaststroke swimmers
Olympic swimmers of Canada
Swimmers at the 1988 Summer Olympics
Swimmers from Edmonton
20th-century Canadian people
21st-century Canadian people